The National Association of Nigerian Prostitutes (NANP) is a professional organization based in Nigeria to assist adult sex workers. The organization was formed out of opposition to the country's prostitution laws which criminalize sex work and all of its related activities. NANP campaigns for equal access to healthcare, a safe work environment and protection from abuse and exploitation. It is headed by a president who is elected by association members every 12 months. As of August 2015, the president of NANP was Jessica Elvis. She held the post until her death from a heart-related
disease on 25 October 2015. The current president and secretary general are Tamar Tion and Sandra Efosa respectively.

See also
Sex-positive movement
Violence against prostitutes
Patoo Abraham

References

Sex worker organizations in Nigeria
Professional associations based in Nigeria
Women's organizations based in Nigeria